Nicholas Ruddock is a Canadian writer. He is the author of two novels, The Parabolist (DoubleDay 2010) and Night Ambulance (Breakwater 2016), and a collection of short stories, How Loveta Got Her Baby (Breakwater 2014). In 2016, he was shortlisted for the richest story prize in the world, the EFG Short Story Award, for his story "The Phosphorescence."

Ruddock was born in Ottawa and raised in the Eglinton Avenue Road area of Toronto. His father was a French professor, his mother a teacher. He attended the University of Toronto Schools and the University of Toronto Medical School. He then set out for Newfoundland and Labrador, interning in St. John's and serving as District Medical Officer in Belleoram, Fortune Bay. Subsequently, he married the artist Cheryl Ruddock and they have raised their family of four children in the Yukon, Montreal, and Guelph, Ontario.

Ruddock is a practicing medical doctor.

Publications

Books
How Loveta Got Her Baby, Breakwater 2014
The Parabolist, Doubleday 2010
Night Ambulance, Breakwater 2016

Magazines and journals

In Canada, Ruddock's writing has been published in The Dalhousie Review, The Antigonish Review, Fiddlehead, Prism International, Grain, sub-Terrain, Event, and Exile. In England, in The Bridport Anthology. In Ireland, Irish Pages and the Fish Anthology. His short story, “How Eunice Got Her Baby” was published in The Journey Prize Anthology in 2007, and the Canadian Film Centre has made a film adaptation of the same story, narrated by Gordon Pinsent, directed by Ana Valine.

References

External links 

 

Living people
21st-century Canadian physicians
Writers from Ottawa
Writers from Toronto
University of Toronto alumni
Canadian male novelists
21st-century Canadian novelists
Canadian male short story writers
21st-century Canadian short story writers
Physicians from Newfoundland and Labrador
21st-century Canadian male writers
Year of birth missing (living people)